Provident Hospital may refer to:

 Provident Hospital (Baltimore)
 Provident Hospital (Chicago)
 Provident Hospital (Fort Lauderdale)